Periptera is a genus of flowering plants belonging to the family Malvaceae.

Its native range is Mexico to Guatemala.

Species
Species:

Periptera ctenotricha 
Periptera lobelioides 
Periptera macrostelis 
Periptera punicea 
Periptera trichostemon

References

Malveae
Malvaceae genera